
Year 158 BC was a year of the pre-Julian Roman calendar. At the time it was known as the Year of the Consulship of Lepidus and Laenas (or, less frequently, year 596 Ab urbe condita) and the Sixth Year of Houyuan. The denomination 158 BC for this year has been used since the early medieval period, when the Anno Domini calendar era became the prevalent method in Europe for naming years.

Events 
 By place 

 Asia Minor 
 At the request of the Romans, Ariarathes V, king of Cappadocia, rejects a proposal from the Seleucid king, Demetrius I, for him to marry the sister of Demetrius I. In response, Seleucid forces attack Cappadocia and remove Ariarathes V from the Cappadocian throne. Demetrius I then replaces him with Orophernes Nicephorus, a supposed son of the late king, Ariarathes IV. With Ariarathes V deprived of his kingdom, he flees to Rome.
 Attalus II Philadelphus, the second son of Attalus I Soter of Pergamum, ascends the throne following the death of his elder brother, Eumenes II.

Births 
 Publius Rutilius Rufus, Roman consul, statesman, orator and historian (d. c. 78 BC)

Deaths 
 Eumenes II, King of Pergamum who has ruled since 197 BC and a member of the Attalid dynasty; a brilliant statesman, he has brought his small kingdom to the peak of its power and made Pergamum a great centre of Greek culture in Anatolia
 Emperor Kōgen of Japan, according to legend.

References